Kalil is a surname. Notable people with this surname include:

 Alexandre Kalil (born 1959), Brazilian politician
 Antônio Petrus Kalil (1925–2019)
 Ariel Kalil (born 1969), American psychologist
 Frank Kalil (born 1959), American American football player
 Haley Kalil (born 1992), American model
 Leonardo Kalil Abdala, Brazilian football player
 Mahamane Kalil Maiga (born 1948), Malian scientist and politician
 Matt Kalil (born 1989), American American football player
 Ryan Kalil (born 1985), American American football player
 Thomas Kalil (born 1963), American politician